Lucy Annie Middleton (née Cox; 9 May 1894 – 20 November 1983) was a Labour politician in the United Kingdom.

Personal life 
In 1936, she married James Middleton, General Secretary of the Labour Party.

Career 
In the 1945 landslide general election, Middleton was elected Member of Parliament for Plymouth Sutton, gaining the seat from the Conservatives, after the retirement of her predecessor Nancy Astor, Viscountess Astor.

Middleton held Plymouth Sutton until 1951, when it was gained by another member of the Astor family, Jakie Astor.

Lucy Middleton was an active member of Wimbledon Labour Party when the idea of publishing a book on the contribution of women to the labour movement was put forward as a way to celebrate International Women's Year.  The Labour Party agreed to publish the book, and Lucy Middleton edited the essays of the 9 younger women she had invited to contribute.  When finished the Labour Party General Secretary decided there was no money to publish the book, but Croom Helm agreed to publish it as "Women in the Labour Movement, the British experience" in 1977.

References

External links 
 

1894 births
1983 deaths
Labour Party (UK) MPs for English constituencies
Female members of the Parliament of the United Kingdom for English constituencies
Members of the Parliament of the United Kingdom for constituencies in Devon
UK MPs 1945–1950
UK MPs 1950–1951
20th-century British women politicians
Politicians from Plymouth, Devon